Rock City vs The Wildhearts is a 2014 live album by The Wildhearts.

It was recorded at Nottingham Rock City in 2013 during the band's 20th anniversary tour for debut album Earth vs The Wildhearts. It consists of two discs - one featuring the main set (in which the group performed the songs from the Earth vs The Wildhearts album in order) and the other featuring the encores (including "Caffeine Bomb," which was not on the original 1993 release of the album but was added for the 1994 re-release).

The album was available for purchase at concerts on the band's 2014 UK tour  and via their official merchandise website.

Track listing

Personnel
 Ginger - vocals, guitar
 C. J. - guitar, vocals
 Rich Battersby - drums, vocals
 Jon Poole - bass, vocals

References

2014 live albums
The Wildhearts live albums